Westover High School is a public high school located in Fayetteville, North Carolina, United States. It is a member of Cumberland County Schools (CCS).

Athletics
The Lady Wolverines won the 2007–2008 State 4A Women's Basketball Championship.

Notable alumni
 Dottie Alexander  keyboardist for of Montreal
 Affion Crockett  actor, writer, dancer, rapper, comedian, and music producer
 Bernie Mangiboyat  musician
 Eric Maynor  NBA player
 Marshall Pitts Jr.  lawyer and politician
 Dennis L.A. White  stage and screen actor

References

Educational institutions established in 1977
Public high schools in North Carolina
Education in Fayetteville, North Carolina
Schools in Cumberland County, North Carolina
1977 establishments in North Carolina